Winterthur District is one of the twelve districts of the German-speaking canton of Zürich, Switzerland. Its capital is the city of Winterthur.

Municipalities 
Winterthur District contains a total of 19 municipalities:

Mergers
On 1 January 2014 the former municipality of Bertschikon merged into the municipality of Wiesendangen.

On 1 January 2018 the former municipality of Hofstetten merged into the municipality of Elgg.

See also 
Municipalities of the canton of Zürich

References

Districts of the canton of Zürich